The indoor mixed doubles competition at the 1912 Summer Olympics was part of the tennis program for the games. The competition was held from May 6, 1912 to May 12, 1912.

Draw

Draw

References
 
 
  ITF, 2008 Olympic Tennis Event Media Guide

X=Mixed indoor doubles
1912 indoor
Mixed events at the 1912 Summer Olympics